Ian Neale Blanchett (born 2 October 1975) is an Australian born English cricketer. Blanchett was a right-handed batsman who bowled right-arm fast-medium. He was born in Melbourne, Victoria.

Educated at Downham Market High School and later Luton University, Blanchett first appeared in county cricket for Norfolk in the 1994 Minor Counties Championship, playing two matches against Bedfordshire and Suffolk. Blanchett later joined Middlesex, making his debut for them in a List A match against Essex in 1997. His first-class debut for the county came against Worcestershire in the 1998 County Championship. He played four further first-class matches for Middlesex till 1999 and eleven further List A matches. In first-class cricket for Middlesex, he took 7 wickets at a bowling average of 60.42, with best figures of 2/38. In List A cricket for Middlesex, he took 5 wickets at an expensive average of 70.00, with best figures of 2/34.

In 2001, Blanchett joined Cambridgeshire. He made his debut in the 2001 MCCA Knockout Trophy against Bedfordshire. He played Minor counties of English and Welsh cricket for Cambridgeshire in 2001 and 2002, which included ten Minor Counties Championship matches and eight MCCA Knockout Trophy matches. Blanchett also played two List A matches for the county, against the Derbyshire Cricket Board in the 2nd round of the 2001 Cheltenham & Gloucester Trophy and Somerset in the 3rd round of the same competition. With the ball he was more successful for Cambridgeshire, taking 5 wickets at an average of 12.60, with best figures of 3/24.

He had previously played Second XI cricket for the Essex Second XI, the Middlesex Second XI, the Kent Second XI and the Somerset Second XI. After the end of his cricket career, Blanchett coached at Ealing College and abroad in Australia and New Zealand.

Blanchett now plays First XI cricket for Williamstown Imperials Cricket Club in the Victorian Turf Cricket Association

References

External links
Ian Blanchett at ESPNcricinfo

1975 births
Living people
Cricketers from Melbourne
British people of Australian descent
English cricketers
Norfolk cricketers
Middlesex cricketers
Cambridgeshire cricketers
English cricket coaches
People from Downham Market
English cricketers of 1969 to 2000
English cricketers of the 21st century